The 1954 New Zealand general election was a nationwide vote to determine the shape of the New Zealand Parliament's 31st term. It saw the governing National Party remain in office, but with a slightly reduced majority. It also saw the debut of the new Social Credit Party, which won more than eleven percent of the vote but failed to win a seat.

Background
The National Party had formed its first administration after the 1949 elections. It had then been re-elected by a large margin amid the industrial disputes of the 1951 election. The Prime Minister, Sidney Holland, was popular in many sectors of society for his strong line against striking dockworkers and coalminers, while Labour's leader, Walter Nash, had been criticised for his failure to take a firm stand on the issue. Labour was troubled by internal disputes, with Nash subjected to an unsuccessful leadership challenge only a few months before the election. For the election, the National government adopted a "steady as she goes" approach, saying that the country was in good hands and did not need any major policy realignments.

The election
The date for the main 1954 elections was 13 November. 1,209,670 people were registered to vote, and turnout was 91.4%. The number of seats being contested was 80, a number which had been fixed since 1902.

The following new (or reconstituted) electorates were introduced in 1954: Heretaunga, Rotorua, Stratford, Waipa and Waitemata.

MPs retiring in 1954
Ten MPs retired at the election, see cartoon.

Paddy Kearins also left parliament at the election. Two Labour MPs had announced their intention to retire at the 1954 election (Harry Combs MP for Onslow and Arthur Osborne MP for Onehunga) but died before the end of the parliament.

Results
The 1954 election saw the governing National Party re-elected with a ten-seat margin, a drop from the twenty-seat margin it previously held. National won forty-five seats to the Labour Party's thirty-five. The popular vote was much closer, however, with the two parties separated by only 0.2% (1,602 votes). No seats were won by minor party candidates or by independents, but the new Social Credit Party managed to win 11.2% of the vote, and it can be argued that Social Credit saved the National Government by providing an alternative to Labour and so minimising the two-party swing.

Votes summary

The table below shows the results of the 1954 general election:

Key

|-
 |colspan=8 style="background-color:#FFDEAD" | General electorates
|-

|-
 | Hauraki
 | style="background-color:;" |
 | style="text-align:center;" | Andy Sutherland
 | style="background-color:;" |
 | style="text-align:center;background-color:;" | Arthur Kinsella
 | style="text-align:right;" | 2,659
 | style="background-color:;" |
 | style="text-align:center;" | Brevat William Dynes
|-

|-
 |colspan=8 style="background-color:#FFDEAD" | Māori electorates
|-

|}

Table footnotes

Notes

References